OpenHPI or openHPI may refer to:

 openHPI (Online Education), an online platform for massive open online courses (MOOC): computer science and information technology.
 OpenHPI (Service Availability) software implementation of the Hardware Platform Interface for Service Availability.